Jean-Baptiste Narcisse Mimiague (3 February 1871 in Villefranche-sur-Mer – 6 August 1929 in Nice) was a French fencer who competed in the early 20th century.

He participated in Fencing at the 1900 Summer Olympics in Paris and won both his bouts against the famous Italian fencer Italo Santelli. He won the bronze medal in the individual foil masters.

References

External links

French male foil fencers
Olympic fencers of France
Fencers at the 1900 Summer Olympics
1871 births
1929 deaths
Olympic bronze medalists for France
Olympic medalists in fencing
Medalists at the 1900 Summer Olympics
Sportspeople from Alpes-Maritimes